Graeme Ferguson may refer to:

 Graeme Ferguson (biathlete) (born 1952), British biathlete
 Graeme Ferguson (filmmaker) (1929–2021), Canadian filmmaker and inventor